Martin Johannes Toralf Buvik (14 January 1923–17 February 2018) was a Norwegian politician for the Conservative Party.

Buvik was a teacher in Skånland and Evenes from 1942 until 1947. After this, he worked for the Conservative Party in Troms county. Later, he was a member of Tromsøysund municipal council from 1955 to 1963. He was elected to the Norwegian Parliament, representing Troms county in 1965, and was re-elected on two occasions, serving from 1965 until 1977.  In 1977, he was appointed to be the County Governor of Troms county, a position he held until 1990.  He was also the chairman of the Norwegian Petroleum Directorate from 1977 until 1989.

References

1923 births
2018 deaths
Conservative Party (Norway) politicians
Members of the Storting
County governors of Norway
Politicians from Tromsø
20th-century Norwegian politicians